The Order for Courage is a Ukrainian award established by Ukrainian president Leonid Kuchma on August 21, 1996. The designer is Ukrainian artist Mykola Lebid.

Awards of the President of Ukraine for Courage
Before August, 1996, personal bravery had been honoured with Awards of the President of Ukraine for Courage: the Star for Courage and the Cross for Courage instituted on April 29, 1995. On August 21, 1996, they were transformed into three classes of the Order for Courage. Recipients of Awards of the President of Ukraine, such as the Star for Courage and the Cross for Courage, are considered to be equal to the recipients of the Order for Courage and they are recognised as holders of the Order for Courage retaining the right to wear decorations that have been granted. Granting the Star For Courage and the Cross for Courage was discontinued following the institution of the Order for Courage.

Medals, star and ribbons

Awardees
 Viktor Gurniak (1987–2014) - Ukrainian scout, photographer, volunteer killed in the Russian-Ukrainian War.
 Aleksandr Akimov (1953–1986) - Engineer and shift supervisor at the Chernobyl Nuclear Power Plant who worked tirelessly unto his death to mitigate the safety risks posed by the Chernobyl disaster.
 Leonid Toptunov (1960–1986) - In the control room at the reactor control panel at the moment of explosion, with Akimov; received fatal dose during attempts to restart feedwater flow into the reactor
 Valery Khodemchuk (1951–1986) - Engineer who was the night shift circulating pump operator at the Chernobyl power plant and was the first victim of Chernobyl disaster
 Yuri A. Vershynin - (died 28 July 1986) -  In the turbine hall at the moment of explosion; received fatal dose (over 1,000 rad) during firefighting and stabilizing the turbine hall, died in a Moscow hospital
 Anatoly I. Shapovalov (died 19 May 1986) -  Electrician during the Chernobyl disaster.
 Viktor V. Proskuryakov (died 17 May 1986) - Present in the control room at the moment of explosion; received fatal dose of radiation while attempting to enter the reactor hall to manually lower the control rods during the Chernobyl disaster
 Valery I. Perevozchenko (died 13 June 1986) - Foreman during the Chernobyl disaster. Received fatal dose of radiation during attempt to locate and rescue Khodemchuk and others, approached the reactor hall together with Kudryavtsev and Proskuryakov
Oleksandr V. Novyk (died 26 July 1986) - Turbine equipment machinist-inspector during Chernobyl disaster Received fatal dosage of more than 1,000 rad during firefighting and stabilizing the turbine hall.
Vladimir I. Tishura (15 December 1959 – 10 May 1986) - First responding firefighter to the Chernobyl disaster. Received a fatal dose whilst extinguishing fires on the roof of reactor 3.
Viktor N. Kibenok (17 February 1963 – 11 May 1986) - Chief of the Pripyat Fire Department, first responder to the Chernobyl disaster. Received a fatal dose of radiation while extinguishing fires on the roof of reactor 3 and around the ventilation chimney.
Vladimir P. Pravik (13 June 1962 –11 May 1986) - The first firefighter to arrive on the scene of the Chernobyl disaster, coordinated firefighting efforts on the roof of the turbine hall and the roof of reactor 3. Received a fatal radiation dose while on the roof of reactor 3.
Vasily I. Ignatenko (13 March 1961 – 13 May 1986) - First responding firefighter after the Chernobyl explosion. Extinguished fires around the ventilation chimney and helped carry his comrades down from the roof. He received a fatal radiation dose while on reactor 3's roof. (13 Sv)
Leonid P. Telyatnikov (25 January 1951 – 2 December 2004) - Chief of the Chernobyl Nuclear Power Plant FD, arrived 10 minutes after the explosion and coordinated all firefighting efforts at the site. He also helped his men into ambulances. (6 Sv)
Nikolai I. Titenok (5 December 1962 – 16 May 1986) - First responder to the Chernobyl disaster. He was a sergeant from the Pripyat Fire Department. Helped firefighting on the roof of reactor 3.
Nina Strokata Karavanska (31 January 1926 – 2 August 1998) - "for civil courage, devotion in the struggle for the establishment of the ideals of freedom and democracy, and on the occasion of the 30th anniversary of the Ukrainian Public Group to promote the implementation of the Helsinki Accords.”
Ivan Fedorov (born 29 August 1988) - Mayor of Melitopol, for bravery at the Battle of Melitopol.
Patron (born 2019) - Bomb-sniffing dog, awarded jointly with his handler Mykhailo Iliev.
 Mikhailo Dianov, soldier involved in the Mariupol resistance.

References

External links
 Laws of Ukraine «About the state awards of Ukraine»
 State award of Ukraine – Order for Courage
 Order for Courage

Military awards and decorations of Ukraine
Civil awards and decorations of Ukraine
Courage awards
Awards established in 1996
1996 establishments in Ukraine